Jack Oakie (born Lewis Delaney Offield; November 12, 1903 – January 23, 1978) was an American actor, starring mostly in films, but also working on stage, radio and television. He portrayed Napaloni in Chaplin's The Great Dictator (1940), receiving a nomination for the Academy Award for Best Supporting Actor.

Early life
Jack Oakie was born in Sedalia, Missouri, at 522 W. Seventh St. His father, James Madison Offield (1880–1939), was a grain dealer, and his mother, Evelyn Offield (nee Jump) (1868–1939), was a psychology teacher. When he was 5, the Offield family moved to Muskogee, Oklahoma, the source of his "Oakie" nickname. His adopted first name, Jack, was the name of the first character he played on stage. Young Lewis/Jack grew up mostly in Oklahoma but also lived for periods of time with his grandmother in Kansas City, Missouri. While there he attended Woodland Elementary and made spending money as a paperboy for The Kansas City Star. He recalled years later that he made especially good money selling "extras" in November 1916 during the presidential election campaign that resulted in Woodrow Wilson being re-elected.

Early career
Oakie worked as a runner on Wall Street and narrowly escaped being killed in the Wall Street bombing of September 16, 1920. While in New York, he also started appearing in amateur theatre as a mimic and a comedian, finally making his professional debut on Broadway in 1923 as a chorus boy in a production of Little Nellie Kelly by George M. Cohan.

Oakie worked in various musicals and comedies on Broadway from 1923 to 1927, when he moved to Hollywood to work in movies at the end of the silent film era. Oakie appeared in five silent films during 1927 and 1928. As the age of the "talkies" began, he signed with Paramount Pictures in 1927. He made his first talking film, The Dummy, in 1929.

Film career
When his contract with Paramount ended in 1934, Oakie decided to freelance. He was remarkably successful, appearing in 87 films, most made in the 1930s and 1940s. In the film Too Much Harmony (1933), the part of Oakie's on-screen mother was played by his real mother, Mary Evelyn Offield. During the 1930s, he was known as "The World's Oldest Freshman", as a result of appearing in numerous films with a collegiate theme. He was also known for refusing to wear screen make-up of any kind, and the frequent use of double-take in his comedy. Oakie was quoted as saying of his studio career: 

Oakie portrayed Benzino Napaloni, the boisterous dictator of Bacteria, in Charlie Chaplin's The Great Dictator (1940), for which he received an Oscar nomination for Best Supporting Actor. This role was a broad parody of the fascist dictator of Italy, Benito Mussolini, then in power.

Television and radio
Not being limited by a film studio contract, Oakie branched into radio and had his own radio show between 1936 and 1938.

Late in his career he appeared in various episodes of a number of television shows, including The Real McCoys (1963, three times as Uncle Rightly), Breaking Point (Episode #22 A Child of the Center Ring,1964), Daniel Boone (1966), and Bonanza (1966).

Personal life
Oakie was married twice. His first marriage to Venita Varden in 1936 ended in 1938 when Venita got an interlocutory decree of divorce. They reconciled, but finally divorced in 1944. She died in 1948 in the crash of United Airlines Flight 624 at Mount Carmel, Pennsylvania.

Oakie's second marriage was in 1950, to actress Victoria Horne, with whom he lived at "Oakridge" until his death in 1978.

Jack Oakie died on January 23, 1978, in Los Angeles, California, at the age of 74 from an aortic aneurysm. His remains were interred at Forest Lawn Memorial Park, Glendale in Los Angeles County.

Oakridge estate
Jack and Victoria Oakie lived their entire married life at "Oakridge", their  estate at 18650 Devonshire Street in Northridge, a suburb of Los Angeles in the San Fernando Valley. They acquired the former "Marwyck" estate of actress Barbara Stanwyck in 1940. Stanwyck commissioned the original residence designed by Paul Williams. Oakie planted a citrus orchard and bred Afghan Hounds, at one time having up to 100 dogs on the property.

Victoria Oakie continued to live there after her husband's death and bequeathed the estate to the University of Southern California, which sold it to developers. After two failed attempts to develop the property, Oakridge was acquired by the City of Los Angeles in December, 2009. Oakridge is considered to be one of the last remnants of the large Northridge equestrian estates, famed for former thoroughbred breeding. The city plans to use the property as a park and community event center. The Paul Williams house and the grounds are Los Angeles Historic-Cultural Monument #484.

Legacy
In 1981, the "Jack Oakie Lecture on Comedy in Film" was established as an annual event of the Academy of Motion Picture Arts and Sciences. At the inaugural presentation, Oakie was described as "a master of comic timing and a beloved figure in the industry."

Jack Oakie's star on the Hollywood Walk of Fame is at 6752 Hollywood Boulevard, and his hand and footprints can be found at Grauman's Chinese Theater in Hollywood.

A small display celebrating the comedy and fame of Jack Oakie is at Motion Picture & Television Country House and Hospital in Woodland Hills, California. There is a plaque in the ground in front of the home where he was born in Sedalia, Missouri.

Jack Oakie is mentioned in the Coen Brothers film Barton Fink as the favorite actor of Charlie, a character played by John Goodman.

Filmography

Bibliography

  Autobiography published posthumously by Oakie's widow on January 1, 1980. 240 pages.
  Letters of congratulation and reminiscence sent from almost 150 celebrities to Jack Oakie in celebration of his 70th birthday. Compiled & edited by Mrs Oakie to commemorate his 90th birthday. 140 pages.

References

External links

 

JACK OAKIE CELEBRATION OF COMEDY IN FILM at oscars.org
Biography of Jack Oakie
Movie Figures Hear Jack Oakie Eulogized as Genius of Comedy
NY Times Biography of Jack Oakie 
 
 Photographs of Jack Oakie
 

American male film actors
Male actors from Oklahoma
Radio personalities from Los Angeles
1903 births
1978 deaths
Male actors from Los Angeles
Paramount Pictures contract players
People from Muskogee, Oklahoma
People from Northridge, Los Angeles
People from Sedalia, Missouri
Deaths from aortic aneurysm
Burials at Forest Lawn Memorial Park (Glendale)
20th-century American male actors